Orjan Xhemalaj (born 7 June 1989 in Ballsh) is an Albanian professional footballer who currently plays for KF Erzeni in the Kategoria e Parë.

Career

Club career
On 30 July 2019 KF Teuta Durrës confirmed, that Xhemalaj had returned to the club. Having only made one appearance for Teuta, he left the club at the end of the year and returned to KF Erzeni in January 2020.

References

External links

1989 births
Living people
People from Mallakastër
Association football midfielders
Albanian footballers
Albania youth international footballers
KF Teuta Durrës players
FK Dinamo Tirana players
FC Kamza players
KF Erzeni players
Besëlidhja Lezhë players
Kategoria Superiore players
Kategoria e Parë players
Kategoria e Dytë players